RWD 22 was a Polish twin-engine torpedo bomber and naval reconnaissance floatplane design. Developed by Leszek Dulęba and Andrzej Anczutin of Doświadczalne Warsztaty Lotnicze (Experimental Aeronautical Workshops, DWL) in 1939, the project was to be developed under the brand of the RWD design bureau. The outbreak of World War II interrupted the design and it never left the planning stage.

Design and development
In late 1930s the Polish Navy sought a replacement for the ageing R-XIIIter and Lublin R-VIII. The new design was to replace those aircraft in both the torpedo bomber and close-range reconnaissance roles. Design of the RWD 22 started in October 1938 and by January 1939 the basic three projects were ready, each with different engine and armament configuration, but with a similar silhouette. The third and final version was to be equipped with a Polish-built third generation  PZL G-1620B Mors II engine, already being used with the RWD-14 Czapla. Alternatively, American Pratt & Whitney R-985 Wasp Junior SB could also be used. A land-based version of the aircraft was also being considered under a separate designation RWD 24.

In the summer of 1939 the third, heaviest variant was chosen by the Polish Navy and a wooden mock-up was completed for aerodynamic trials. The designers also received 150.000 Polish złoty for the prototype, which was to be completed by mid-1940. The first serial run was to be started in 1940 and by early 1942 the Naval Air Squadron was to receive the first 12 planes. However, the Nazi and Soviet invasion of Poland and the outbreak of World War II interrupted further works.

Specifications (RWD 22 estimated)

References

Notes

Bibliography

External links

1930s Polish bomber aircraft
1930s Polish military reconnaissance aircraft
RWD aircraft